Moving is an upcoming South Korean web series directed by Park In-jae. It is a  Disney+ original series starring Ryu Seung-ryong, Han Hyo-joo, and Zo In-sung. Based on eponymous webtoon by Kang Full, the series is a supernatural drama that deals with three teenager high school students and their parents who discover their super powers. It is scheduled to premiere on Disney+ in 2023.

Cast

Main
 Ryu Seung-ryong as Jang Joo-won
 He has the ability to recover quickly without feeling pain.
 Han Hyo-joo as Lee Mi-hyeon
 Having superhuman senses.
 Zo In-sung as Kim Doo-shik
 A veteran agent with flying skills.

Supporting
 Cha Tae-hyun as Jeon Gye-do
 He has the ability to generate electricity.
 Ryoo Seung-bum as Frank
 A mysterious person who pursues people with superpowers.
 Kim Hee-won as Choi Il-hwan
 A teacher who teaches children with supernatural powers.
 Kim Sung-kyun as Lee Jae-man
 A fast and powerful agent.
 Lee Jung-ha as Kim Bong-seok
 He is the son of Lee Mi-hyeon.
 Go Youn-jung as Jang Hee-soo
 She has the same superpowers as her parents.
 Kim Do-hoon as Lee Kang-hoon
 The class leader with the same superpowers as his parents.
 Moon Sung-keun as Min Yong-jun
A hidden character with huge power
 Kwak Sun-young as Hwang Ji-hee
 Kim Shin-rok as Yeo Woon-gyu
 She is the one who plans and controls everything for the success of missions within the massive forces hidden under the veil. 
 Park Hee-soon as Kim Deok-yun
 Shin Jae-hwi as Bang Ki-soo
 The person who confronted Kang Hoon class leader.
 Park Bo-kyung

Production

Development 
The series is screen adaptation of Kang Full's webtoon of the same name. On September 9, 2020 it was revealed that Jo In-sung who last appeared in 2014 TV series It's Okay, That's Love has received offer to appear in the series. On October 13, 2021 Disney+ announced Moving as their tentpole show for pan Asian market.

Casting 
On October 29, 2021 casting lineup was revealed by releasing script reading site and photos.

Filming 
After completing the casting of the series on August 23 it has begun filming on August 26.

References

External links
 
 Moving at Kakao Webtoon 

Upcoming television series
Television shows based on South Korean webtoons
South Korean fantasy television series
Disney+ original programming
Television series by Next Entertainment World
2023 South Korean television series debuts
2023 web series debuts
South Korean web series